Hungarian diaspora is a term that encompasses the total ethnic Hungarian population located outside current-day Hungary.

There are two main groups of the diaspora. The first group includes those who are autochthonous to their homeland and live outside Hungary since the border changes of the post-World War I Treaty of Trianon of 1920. The victorious forces redrew the borders of Hungary so that it runs through Hungarian majority areas. As a consequence, 3.3 million Hungarians found themselves outside the new borders. These Hungarians are usually not counted into the term "Hungarian diaspora" but are regardless listed in this article. The other main group is the emigrants who left Hungary at various times (such as the Hungarian Revolution of 1956). There has been some emigration since Hungary joined the EU, especially to countries such as Germany, but that has not been as drastic as for certain other Central European countries like Poland or Slovakia.

Distribution by country 

Hungarian immigration patterns to Western Europe increased in the 1990s and especially since 2004, after Hungary's admission in the European Union. Thousands of Hungarians from Hungary sought available work through guest-worker contracts in the United Kingdom, Ireland, Finland, Sweden, Spain, and Portugal.

Hungarian citizenship 

A proposal supported by the DAHR to grant Hungarian citizenship to Hungarians living in Romania but without meeting Hungarian-law residency requirements was narrowly defeated at a 2004 referendum in Hungary. The referendum was invalid because of not enough participants. After the failure of the 2004 referendum, the leaders of the Hungarian ethnic parties in the neighboring countries formed the HTMSZF organization in January 2005, as an instrument lobbying for preferential treatment in the granting of Hungarian citizenship.

In 2010 some amendments were passed in Hungarian law facilitating an accelerated naturalization process for ethnic Hungarians living abroad; among other changes, the residency-in-Hungary requirement was waived. Between 2011 and 2012, 200,000 applicants took advantage of the new, accelerated naturalization process; there were another 100,000 applications pending in the summer of 2012. As of February 2013, the Hungarian government has granted almost 400,000 citizenships to Hungarians ‘beyond the borders’. In June 2013, Deputy Prime Minister Zsolt Semjén announced that he expects the number to reach about half a million by the end of the year.

The new citizenship law, which took effect on 1 January 2011, did not grant however the right to vote, even in national elections, to Hungarian citizens unless they also reside in Hungary on a permanent basis. A month later however, the Fidesz government announced that it intended to grant the right to vote to its new citizens. In 2014, the Hungarian citizens from abroad are able to participate in the parliamentary elections without Hungarian residency, however they can not vote for a candidate running for the seat in the single-seat constituency but for a party list.

In May 2010, Slovakia announced it would strip Slovak citizenship from anyone applying for the Hungarian one. Romania's President Traian Băsescu declared in October 2010 that "We have no objections to the adoption by the Hungarian government and parliament of a law making it easier to grant Hungarian citizenship to ethnic Hungarians living abroad."

Famous people of Hungarian descent

Politics
Ever since the Hungarian diaspora can vote in elections in Hungary in 2012, they have supported the ruling Fidesz with major records, in the 2014 Hungarian parliamentary election Fidesz won over 95% of the vote, in the 2018 Hungarian parliamentary election over 96% while in the 2019 European Parliament election in Hungary Fidesz got 96%.

 In Romania, Democratic Alliance of Hungarians in Romania representing the Hungarian minority interests of Romania.
 In Serbia, Alliance of Vojvodina Hungarians representing the Hungarian minority interests in Serbia.
 In Slovakia, Alliance (Slovak political party) representing the Hungarian minority interests in Slovakia.
 In Croatia, Democratic Union of Hungarians of Croatia representing the Hungarian minority interests in Croatia.

Gallery

See also
List of Hungarians
Demographics of Hungary
History of Hungary
Hungarian Revolution of 1956
Treaty of Trianon

Notes

References

External links

 
European diasporas